Growing Up with Chinese is a TV program on CCTV-News (now CGTN), the English-language channel of China Central Television, that aims to teach Simplified Mandarin Chinese to teenagers, through the 300 most commonly spoken phrases. It currently consists of 100 episodes, each being 15 minutes in length. Each lesson features 3 short phrases, and a dramatical skit that's played two times.

Starting from August 2, 2010, it aired new lessons from Monday to Sunday at 17:15 and 00:15 BJT, and rebroadcast on the other days. In early April 2011, it was announced by CCTV-News that Growing Up with Chinese would cease broadcasting as of April 10, 2011 for reasons that were not made public. Later that same month, it was announced that the show was scheduled to continue broadcasting shortly, with planned releases scheduled for early May, but they were not released online until late June. Currently all the videos on the program's CCTV main page are down, but the episodes are otherwise available online through being reuploaded on other sites such as YouTube.

Episode disposition 
The skits are set in realistic situations and demonstrates useful phrases.

 Dramatical skit with Hanzi subtitles
 Host explains the phrases demonstrated in the skit
 Dramatical skit with subtitles in English, Hanzi, and evt. pinyin
 Host reviews the Chinese words by discussing their translation, meaning and pronunciation. The hanzi characters are not always shown with pinyin written underneath. 
 Primer section is when the host reviews grammar points, relevant to the episode's lesson
 Cultural spotlight is when the host talks about Chinese culture, usually relevant to the skit's topic.
 Animated skits demonstrating advanced phrases
 Q&A is when the host reads and answers questions and messages sent by viewers.

Plot 
The dramatical skits (called dialogue sequences) follow the life of Mike, a foreign exchange student, as he begins living in China. The series starts with Xiaoming buying an American football in anticipation for Mike's arrival (E1). Soon after, we see Mike being escorted by their homeroom teacher (E2), before they arrive at the Wang household (E3-E4). In the living room, Xiaoming shows Mike a photobook of his family and friends (E5), before they head outside where they encounter Lanlan reading a "secret" book (E6). Later the same day, they prank auntie into preparing dinner earlier by turning the clock an hour forward (E7). During dinner, Auntie offers Mike a knife and fork instead of chopstick, before Mike tells them about his family (E8-E9).

The tenth episode is perhaps a stand-alone flashback, as there's no trace of Mike in this dramatical skit; Xiaoming laments that he's too late for the live NBA game on TV, until his father figures they've got the date wrong, meaning the show will air the day (E10). It's now the second day of Mike's stay, and auntie explains to her son that Mike is jetlagged and needs to sleep in today (E11). Xiaoming heads outside, where he plays  ball with Lanlan (E12). Back home, Mike has finally awoken. Auntie tells him to put on some slippers, while she prepares some breakfast for him (E13). Xiaoming has finally returned home, and the boys are sent out on an errand. En route, Mike asks where the post office is (E14).

Cast and characters 
The show is hosted by Charlotte MacInnis.  The dramatic sequence section of Growing Up with Chinese stars Tian Yuanhao (田原皓), Wang Haocheng (王浩丞), and Azi Guli (阿孜古丽). The cast portrays students around the age of 14 i.e. prior to High School/College and were in fact of that age at the time of filming.

Main 

 Mike (Tian Yuanhao) is an exchange student from North America.
 Wang Xiaoming or 王小明 (Wang Haocheng) is the son of Mike's host family.
 Lanlan or 兰兰 (Azi Guli) is Xiao Ming's childhood friend. The actress is a Uyghur ethnic minority who speaks perfect Chinese.

Recurring 

 Xiaoming's mother 
 Xiaoming's father

Credits 

 Text writer: Lu Yun
 English supervisor: Cheng Lei 
 Supervisor: Fan Yun
 Sound: Liu Xueyong
 Light: Li Qi
 Make-up: Gao Ling, Jia Fanglin
 Camera: An Saigang, Li Qi
 Technician: Zhang Hao
 "Interactive Digital Blackboard kindly provided by Vtron Technologies Ltd."

Episode guide 

(This episode guide is incomplete.)

References

External links 

 Growing Up with Chinese dialogue transcripts by Chinese Extensive Listening.

Chinese television shows
China Central Television
2010 Chinese television series debuts
Educational television series
Language education television series